Grace Deeb (born May 29, 1975 in Beirut) is a Lebanese singer. She was born among a family of musicians and began her career at the age of four. She sings in multiple languages.

Biography
Grace formed an English-singing band when she was at school, named "Strangers". After that she released a few singles and performed in weddings and piano bars. Her first appeared on TV in the well-known duet W In Kan Alayya ("If It Was For Me") in 2003 meaning  with the Arabian singer Assi El Helani. After that, Grace collaborated with Jean-Jacques Goldman who named Grace as "Dalida of the Arabs" in the song that changed records and made her famous locally and internationally; Comme Toi and then Calling You, the former in French and Arabic and the latter in English and Arabic.

Immediately after that, Grace signed a 5-year contract with the most famous production company in the Arab world "Rotana Records". She worked with the Anoud Maaliki during her time with Rotana Records. Her first album was released on 23 August 2004 entitled Ghannali El-Alam Kello ("The Whole World Sang To Me"). It enjoyed great success and only 20 days after it release, Grace was asked to go to Frankfurt to represent the Arab world along with the Egyptian singer Amr Diab in the Frankfurt Book Fair and sang 3 songs from the album; Ghannali, Wallah Bitmoun and Heya which inspired the audience and made a good buzz which made the organizers release a cd of all participants in the book fair including the 3 songs that Grace sang.

In 2005, Grace released a cover of the song Helwa Ya Balady by the late Dalida and reached number one spots over the charts.

The second album to be released was Ghinniyat Grace Deeb ... Aktar Min Gharam ("Grace Deeb's Songs ... More Than Love") on the 28th of February, 2006 and made great feedbacks all over the Arab world.
In 2006, Grace got named "Ambassador" of Kibarouna Association which takes care of old people. The third album on the way was Ma Bteshbah Hada ("You Don't Look Like Anyone Else") on 11 June 2008. This album was called the best-selling album by Grace Deeb. In 2009, Grace got named "Ambassador" of Anhar Al-Mahabba Foundation which takes care of people suffering from AIDS (HIV).

Grace works now on many humanitarian issues mentioning; Associations that take care of elderly people, Abortion, AIDS (HIV) and Breast Cancer.

Grace finished a demo cd containing 8 songs in 8 languages to use it in her concerts around the world but not to be released in stores and with the end of 2009, Grace surprised everyone with her decision of leaving her production company Rotana and now she is working on her own.

Grace's recent works is a Christian CD called "Grace Deeb Singing From The Tent Of Praise" which included You Raise Me Up which is a re-make of Josh Groban's song. She also recorded many other private singles for her, to name a few: Love Story, Je Suis Malade, That's The Way It Is, Perhaps, Magapy, Maria, Ya Habiby Ta'ala Elha'ni, Akher Eyyam El-Sayfiyeh and many others including a re-make of 3 songs from her 1st album but in different languages; "Chantons L'amour En Guitare" (Ghannali previously) -French, Arabic and English -, Hard On Me (Hiya previously) - English and Arabic -, Believe The Story (Mabrouk Aleiky previously) - English and Arabic -.

Discography 

 Ghannali El-Alam Kello (2004)
 Ghinniyat Grace Deeb ... Aktar Min Gharam  (2006)
 Ma Bteshbah Hada (2008)
 Singles (Various Years):
 I Like Your Style
 It's Really Hard
 I Need A Hero
 Praise
 My Daily Bread
 Ma A'zamak
 Play Don't Stop
 Helwa Ya Balady
 You Raise Me Up
 Chantons L'amour En Guitare
 Hard On Me (Hiya)
 Ghanni

Videography
W In Kan Alayya (Ft. Assi El-Hillany) - 2003
Calling You - 2004
Comme Toi - 2004
Ghannali - 2004
Ana Habayt - 2004
Wallah Bitmoun - 2005
Aktar Min Gharam - 2006
Ghinniyat - 2007
O'zoriny - 2008
Gelly Keef - 2009
Bo'dak Anny - 2009
Einy Fi Eino - 2009
Ma Bteshbah Hada - 2010
 Ghanni - 2011

References

External links 
 Official Site
 Official Yahoo Group
 Official Forum

1975 births
Living people
21st-century Lebanese women singers
Rotana Records artists